Vestal Central School District is a school district in Vestal, New York. The former Vestal Central School was listed on the National Register of Historic Places in 2010.

List of Schools

High School (Grades 9–12):
Vestal High School
Middle Schools (Grades 6–8):
Vestal Middle School
Elementary Schools (Grades K-5):
African Road Elementary School  
Clayton Avenue Elementary School
Glenwood Elementary School
Tioga Hills Elementary School
Vestal Hills Elementary School

See also
 List of school districts in New York

References

External links
 

School districts in New York (state)
Education in Broome County, New York